In Egyptian mythology, Kebechet (spelt in hieroglyphs as Qeb-Hwt, and also transliterated as Khebhut, Kebehut, Qébéhout, Kabehchet and Kebehwet) is a goddess, a deification of embalming liquid. Her name means cooling water.

Myths
Kebechet is a daughter of Anubis and his wife Anput. In the Pyramid Texts, Kebechet is referred to as a serpent who "refreshes and purifies" the pharaoh.

Kebechet was thought to give water to the spirits of the dead while they waited for the mummification process to be complete. She was probably related to mummification where she would fortify the body against corruption, so it would stay fresh for reanimation by the deceased's ka.

References

Egyptian death goddesses
Snake goddesses

ca:Llista de personatges de la mitologia egípcia#K